Lieutenant-Colonel Orlando Bridgeman, 5th Earl of Bradford, DL, JP (6 October 1873 – 21 March 1957), styled Viscount Newport from 1898 to 1915, was a British peer, Conservative politician and soldier.

Background
Bridgeman was the oldest son of George Bridgeman, 4th Earl of Bradford and his wife Lady Ida Frances Annabella Lumley, second daughter of Richard Lumley, 9th Earl of Scarbrough. Bridgeman was educated at Harrow School and went then to Trinity College, Cambridge, where he graduated with a Bachelor of Arts in 1896 and with a Master of Arts in 1903. At Cambridge, he was secretary of the Pitt Club. He succeeded his father as earl in 1915.

Career
Bridgeman joined the 3rd (Militia) Battalion of The Royal Scots (Lothian Regiment), and was appointed a captain on 29 April 1899. The battalion was embodied in December 1899 to serve in the Second Boer War, and in early March 1900 left Queenstown, Ireland on the SS Oriental for South Africa. He fought in the war after arrival in 1900, and again in 1902, returning from Cape Town to the United Kingdom with most of his regiment in May 1902. He again fought in the First World War from 1915 as a lieutenant-colonel. Bridgeman was appointed Honorary Colonel of the King's Shropshire Light Infantry in 1939.

Bridgeman was assistant private secretary to Robert Gascoyne-Cecil, 3rd Marquess of Salisbury in his posts as Secretary of State for Foreign Affairs between 1898 and 1900 and as Prime Minister of the United Kingdom for a few weeks during the summer of 1902. Salisbury resigned on 11 July 1902, and Lord Newport subsequently was private secretary to Salisbury's successor Arthur Balfour from July 1902 until 1905. Having joined the House of Lords on his father's death, Bridgeman became Government Whip in 1919, a post he held until 1924. He was Justice of the Peace for Shropshire and represented the latter county as well as Warwickshire as Deputy Lieutenant, too. In 1932 he served as treasurer of the Royal Salop Infirmary in Shrewsbury.

Family
On 21 July 1904, he married The Hon. Margaret Cecilia Bruce (28 October 1882 – 16 April 1949), daughter of Henry Bruce, 2nd Baron Aberdare. They had five children:

Lady Helen Diana Bridgeman (22 June 1907 – 7 May 1967), married Sir Robert Henry Edward Abdy, 5th Bt. (11 September 1896 – 17 November 1976) on 10 February 1930 and divorced in 1962
The Hon. Ursula Mary Bridgeman (12 July 1909 – 6 May 1912)
Gerald Michael Orlando Bridgeman, 6th Earl of Bradford (29 September 1911 – 30 August 1981)
Lady Anne Pamela Bridgeman (12 June 1913 – 21 May 2009), married Lieutenant-Colonel Weetman John Churchill Pearson, 3rd Viscount Cowdray (27 February 1910 – 19 January 1995) on 19 July 1939 and divorced in 1950
Lady Joan Serena Bridgeman (29 May 1916 – 23 July 1935)

References

External links

1873 births
1957 deaths
5
Alumni of Trinity College, Cambridge
British Army personnel of the Second Boer War
British Army personnel of World War I
Conservative Party (UK) Baronesses- and Lords-in-Waiting
Deputy Lieutenants of Shropshire
Deputy Lieutenants of Warwickshire
People educated at Harrow School
Scots Guards officers
Orlando